The Assmanns is a 1925 German silent film directed by Arthur Bergen and starring Grete Reinwald, Bruno Kastner, and Auguste Prasch-Grevenberg.

The film's sets were designed by the art director Max Knaake.

Cast

References

External links

1925 films
Films of the Weimar Republic
Films directed by Arthur Bergen
German silent feature films
National Film films
German black-and-white films